Våge (or the older spelling Vaage) may refer to:

Places
Våge, Agder, a village in Lindesnes municipality, Agder county, Norway
Våge, Austevoll, a village in Austevoll municipality, Vestland county, Norway
Våge, Møre og Romsdal, a village in Sande municipality, Møre og Romsdal county, Norway
Våge, Rogaland, a village in Karmøy municipality, Rogaland county, Norway
Våge, Tysnes, a village in Tysnes municipality, Vestland county, Norway

People
Jakob Vaage, a Norwegian skier and historian
Lars Vaage, a Norwegian physician and politician
Lars Amund Vaage, a Norwegian author and playwright
Ragnvald Vaage, a Norwegian farmer, poet, novelist, and children's writer

See also
Våga (disambiguation)
Vågan
Vágar
Vågen (disambiguation)
Vague (disambiguation)